SJI may refer to:
St. Joseph's Institution, a school in Singapore
St. John's Institution, a school in Kuala Lumpur, Malaysia
South Jersey Industries, an energy services holding company
San Juan Island, USA
 The St. James Infirmary Clinic in San Francisco, California
 San Jose Airport (Mindoro), Philippines (IATA code)